Maureen Eke  (born 19 December 1986) is a Nigerian women's international footballer who plays as a midfielder. She is a member of the Nigeria women's national football team and was in the team at the 2007 FIFA Women's World Cup. At club level, Eke plays for Delta Queens FC in Delta State, Nigeria.

References

1986 births
Living people
Nigerian women's footballers
Nigeria women's international footballers
Place of birth missing (living people)
2007 FIFA Women's World Cup players
Women's association football midfielders
Delta Queens F.C. players